On April 14–15, 1886, a destructive tornado outbreak affected portions of the Midwestern and Southern United States. The outbreak generated at least 18 tornadoes, four of which were violent, including the St. Cloud–Sauk Rapids tornado, an F4 tornado that tore through the cities of St. Cloud, Sauk Rapids, and Rice, Minnesota, on April 14, destroying much of the town of Sauk Rapids and killing 72 people along its path. It is the deadliest tornado on record in Minnesota. Other tornadoes occurred in Iowa, Kansas, Missouri, and Texas on the same day, suggesting the possibility of a large outbreak. In all, the entire outbreak killed at least 87 people and injured at least 324.

Confirmed tornadoes
The ratings for these tornadoes were done by tornado expert Thomas P. Grazulis and are not official ratings.

April 14 event

April 15 event

St. Cloud–Sauk Rapids, Minnesota

At 4:20 p.m., a tornado of approximately F4 intensity cut through the heart of Sauk Rapids. It was one of at least four tornadoes that affected the region between 3:00 p.m. – 5:00 p.m. that day. As the storm moved across the Mississippi River, it temporarily sucked the river dry. Some of the structures the tornado destroyed included an iron truss bridge spanning the Mississippi River, the post office, the courthouse, a flour mill, a school, and two churches. 15 railcars were demolished, and iron rails from the train track were pulled up and mangled. After passing through Sauk Rapids, the tornado moved on to Rice, where it killed 11 people in a wedding party, including the groom, when the home they were occupying was destroyed. In all, 72 people were killed by the twister, including 38 in Sauk Rapids and 20 in St. Cloud. Over 200 more were injured.

Impact, aftermath, and recovery

St. Benedict's Hospital in St. Cloud, which was spared by the tornado, became the center of relief efforts following the destruction. The Benedictine nuns who operated the hospital worked 48 hours straight until aid arrived from the nearby towns of Minneapolis and St. Paul. Over 50 patients were taken to St. Mary's school and convent in St. Joseph, where the teaching sisters served as nurses.

Before the tornado struck, Sauk Rapids was considered one of the most important towns in Minnesota and a center of business for central Minnesota. It was a blossoming community located on the Mississippi River. However, the tornado changed the economic structure of the entire area, destroying at least 109 commercial and public buildings in Sauk Rapids alone, including every business on Main Street, and causing over $400,000 ($ in ) in damages. After the tornado, St. Cloud became the dominant business center in the region.

See also
Climate of Minnesota
List of Minnesota weather records
List of North American tornadoes and tornado outbreaks

Notes

References

Sources
 

 - Total pages: 128

External links
Section of With Lamps Burning discussing the cyclone from the book With Lamps Burning, an early history of the Saint Benedict's Monastery, by Grace McDonald. Made available online by the College of Saint Benedict Archives.

Benton County, Minnesota
F4 tornadoes by date
Sauk Rapids
Natural disasters in Minnesota
Stearns County, Minnesota
Tornadoes of 1886
Tornadoes in Minnesota
1886 in Minnesota
1886 natural disasters in the United States
April 1886 events